Muhammad Zahid Khan (Urdu: محمد زاہد خان b. 14 April 1956) is a Pakistani Politician. He was a Member of the Senate of Pakistan, serving as the Chairperson- Senate Committee on Water and Power. Zahid Khan currently serves as the central spokesperson of the Awami National Party and has held this position since 1990.

Early life 
Zahid Khan was born in the village of Odigram of Lower Dir District, Khyber Pakhtunkhwa. He got his early education from his native town and intermediate education from Govt Degree College Timergara. He holds a bachelor's degree in business administration (BBA).

Political career
Zahid Khan started his political career at a very young age from school. On the ticket of Awami National Party, Zahid Khan became a member of the Senate of Pakistan for the first time in 1997.  Zahid Khan, once again on the ticket of Awami National Party, became a member of the Senate of Pakistan in March 2009 for the second time. He remained Senator till March 2015. He remained the chairperson of Senate Committee on Water and Power and member of senate committees of Communications, Information Technology & Telecommunication and Parliamentary Affairs.

See also
 List of Senators of Pakistan
 List of committees of the Senate of Pakistan

References

External links
Senate of Pakistan Official Website
Awami National Party Official Website

Living people
Pashtun people
Awami National Party politicians
Members of the Senate of Pakistan
People from Upper Dir District
1956 births